Sumba, previously Soemba, is an island in eastern Indonesia. It is one of the Lesser Sunda Islands and is in the province of East Nusa Tenggara. To the northwest of Sumba is Sumbawa, to the northeast, across the Sumba Strait (Selat Sumba), is Flores, to the east, across the Savu Sea, is Timor, and to the south, across part of the Indian Ocean, is Australia. It is likely that its name is shared with Sumbawa, which is probably derived from Sanskrit śāmbhawa (शम्भु), meaning 'related to Śambhu (= 'the Benevolent', a name for Shiva)'.

History
Before colonization by western Europeans in the 1500s, Sumba was inhabited by Melanesian and Austronesian people.

In 1522, through the Portuguese, the first ships from Europe arrived. By 1866 Sumba belonged to the Dutch East Indies, although the island did not come under real Dutch administration until the 20th century. The Dutch mission started in 1886. One of the missionary was Douwe Wielenga. Jesuits opened a mission in Laura, West Sumba.

Historically, this island exported sandalwood and was known as Sandalwood Island, or Sandel Island.

Despite contact with western cultures, Sumba is one of the few places in the world where megalithic burials are used as a 'living tradition' to inter prominent individuals when they die. Burial in megaliths is a practice that was used in many parts of the world during the Neolithic and Bronze Ages. It has survived to this day in Sumba and has raised significant interest from scholars. At Anakalang, for instance, quadrangular adzes have been unearthed.

Another long-lasting tradition is the sometimes lethal game of pasola, in which teams of often several hundred horse-riders fight with spears.

On August 19, 1977, an earthquake measuring 7.0 on the Richter scale occurred and caused a tsunami. 316 people were killed on the island and islands off the west coast.

Geography, climate and ecology

The largest town on the island is the main port of Waingapu, with a population of 35,932 in 2021.

The landscape is low, limestone hills, rather than the steep volcanoes of many Indonesian islands. There is a dry season from May to November and a rainy season from December to April. The western side of the island is more fertile and more heavily populated than the east.

Due to its distinctive flora and fauna Sumba has been categorised by the World Wildlife Fund as the Sumba deciduous forests ecoregion. Although generally thought to be originally part of the Gondwana southern hemisphere supercontinent, recent research suggests that it might have detached from the South East Asia margin. Sumba is in the Wallacea region, having a mixture of plants and animals of Asian and Australasian origin. Most of the island was originally covered in deciduous monsoon forest while the south-facing slopes, which remain moist during the dry season, were evergreen rainforest.

Fauna

There are a number of mammals, but the island is particularly rich in bird-life with nearly 200 birds, of which seven endemic species and a number of others are found only here and on some nearby islands. The endemic birds include the endangered Sumba eclectus parrot, four vulnerable species — the secretive Sumba boobook owl, Sumba buttonquail, red-naped fruit-dove, and Sumba hornbill — as well as three more common species: the Sumba green pigeon, Sumba flycatcher, and apricot-breasted sunbird. Saltwater crocodiles can still be found in some areas.

The Sumba hornbill or Julang Sumba (Rhyticeros everetti) is under increasing threat of extinction. Indiscriminate deforestation is threatening their survival. The population is estimated at less than 4,000 with an average density of six individuals per square kilometre. A hornbill can fly to and from over an area of up to 100 square kilometres.

Threats and preservation
Most of the original forest has been cleared for the planting of maize, cassava, and other crops so only small isolated patches remain. Furthermore, this clearance is ongoing due to the growing population of the island and this represents a threat to the birds.

In 1998 two national parks were designated on the island for the protection of endangered species: the Laiwangi Wanggameti National Park and Manupeu Tanah Daru National Park.

Administration
Sumba is part of the East Nusa Tenggara province. The island and the very small offshore islands administered with it are split into four regencies (local government regions), following re-organisation on 2 January 2007 when two new regencies were created from parts of West Sumba Regency. The four regencies are Sumba Barat (West Sumba), Sumba Barat Daya (Southwest Sumba), Sumba Tengah (Central Sumba) and Sumba Timur (East Sumba). The island had 686,113 inhabitants at the 2010 Census, which accounted for 14.6% of the provincial population in 2020. The figures for the regencies in 2010, 2020 and mid-2021 are given below. The provincial capital is not on Sumba Island, but in Kupang on West Timor.

Culture

Sumba has a highly stratified society based on castes. This is especially true of East Sumba, whereas West Sumba is more ethnically and linguistically diverse.

The Sumbanese people speak a variety of closely related Austronesian languages and have a mixture of Austronesian and Melanesian ancestry. The largest language group is the Kambera language, spoken by a quarter of a million people in the eastern half of Sumba.

Twenty-five to thirty percent of the population practices the animist Marapu religion. The remainder are Christian, a majority being Dutch Calvinist with a substantial minority being Roman Catholic. A small number of Sunni Muslims can be found along the coastal areas.

Sumba is famous for ikat textiles, particularly very detailed hand-woven ikat. The process of dyeing and weaving ikat is labor-intensive and one piece can take months to prepare.

Development and living standards
Sumba is one of the poorer islands of Indonesia.

Health
A relatively high percentage of the population suffers from malaria, although the illness is almost eradicated in the west part of the island. Infant mortality is high.

Water
Access to water is one of the major challenges in Sumba. During the dry season, many streams dry up and villagers depend on wells for scarce supplies of water. Many villagers have to travel several kilometres several times a day to fetch water. It is mainly the women and children who are sent for water, while the men are at work. The Sumba Foundation has been active in raising sponsorship to drill wells in villages and attempting to reduce poverty on the island. As of February 2013, the Sumba Foundation were responsible for 48 wells and 191 water stations, a supplying 15 schools with water and sanitation, and reducing malaria rates by some 85%.

Electricity
Electricity mainly comes from diesel generators. New projects include 3 MW Bayu wind power plant (PLTB) in Kadumbul, East Sumba by PT Hywind.  Another is the Bodo Hula Biomass Power Plant (PLTBm), West Sumba. 1 MW capacity. Other existing renewable electricity projects involve solar PV and micro-hydroelectricity.

Tourism

Areas of interest 
 Tanggedu Waterfall, 26 kilometres from the East Sumba Regency's capital city of Waingapu.
 Puru Kambera Beach, 26 kilometres from Waingapu, a one-hour drive
 Tarimbang Bay, 120 kilometres from Waingapu, a three-hour drive, is a surfers paradise with 2- to 3-meter tall waves between June and September.
 Watu Mandorak Cove, a white sandy beach with cliffs, a two-hour drive, and 42 kilometers from Tambolaka in the dry season. It takes longer and is not recommended in the rainy season.
 The Sumba Hospitality Foundation is located in Sumba Barat or West Sumba. The Foundation is an organization dedicated to providing vocational education in hospitality to underprivileged students hailing from all across Sumba.

International hotels 
The island's most popular resort is the Nihi Sumba, which has been ranked as one of the world's five best eco-hotels and was awarded the world's best hotel of 2016 and 2017 from Travel + Leisure for its native ambiance and authentic local experience. Despite its expensive rates, the resort has been fully booked.

See also

Soemba Mission

Notes

References

External links 

Sumba tourist and social information (private website)

Map
Tourist and Road Map of Sumba
Sumba Islands maps

 
Australasian ecoregions
Ecoregions of Indonesia
Ecoregions of Malesia
Islands of Indonesia
Landforms of East Nusa Tenggara
Lesser Sunda Islands
Tropical and subtropical dry broadleaf forests
Wallacea
Islands of the Indian Ocean
Populated places in Indonesia